Haplochromis nuchisquamulatus is a species of cichlid found in Lake Victoria and the adjacent reaches of the Nile.  This species can reach a length of  SL.

References

nuchisquamulatus
Freshwater fish of Kenya
Fish of Lake Victoria
Fish described in 1888
Taxonomy articles created by Polbot